Sandy Point may refer to:

Locations in Africa
Sandy Point, Tristan da Cunha, easternmost point of the island.

Locations in Australia
Sandy Point, New South Wales, a suburb of Sydney
Sandy Point, Victoria

Locations in Canada
Sandy Point, Newfoundland and Labrador, now an island due to erosion
 Sandy Point, Nova Scotia, a town at the southern tip of the peninsula
 Sandy Point 221, an Indian reservation in Alberta

Locations in the Caribbean
Sandy Point, Bahamas, a town on the island of Great Abaco
Sandy Point Town, Saint Anne Sandy Point, Saint Kitts and Nevis
Sandy Point National Wildlife Refuge, Saint Croix, U.S. Virgin Islands
Sandy Point, U.S. Virgin Islands, settlement on Saint Croix, U.S. Virgin Islands

Locations in Chile
Sandy Point, Chile, the original English name for Punta Arenas

Locations in the United States

Maine
Sandy Point, Maine near Prospect, Maine

Maryland
Sandy Point, Maryland
Sandy Point State Park near Annapolis, Maryland, United States
Sandy Point Farmhouse, Sandy Point, Maryland, listed on the NRHP in Maryland
Sandy Point Shoal Light Station, Skidmore, Maryland, Listed on the NRHP in Maryland
Sandy Point Site, Ocean City, Maryland, listed on the NRHP in Maryland

Massachusetts
 Sandy Point State Reservation on Plum Island, Massachusetts

North Carolina
Sandy Point (Edenton, North Carolina), listed on the NRHP in North Carolina

Rhode Island
 Sandy Point Lighthouse on Prudence Island, Rhode Island
 Sandy Point Island, a small island in Little Narragansett Bay

Texas
 Sandy Point, Texas, a town of that state

Virginia
Sandy Point, Virginia (disambiguation), various locations
 Sandy Point, a location on the James River in Charles City County, Virginia
 Sandy Point State Forest, located in King William County, Virginia
 Sandy Point, Westmoreland County, Virginia, an unincorporated community of that county
 Sandy Point, Northumberland County, Virginia, an unincorporated community of that county